Berlin Irish RFC is a German rugby union club from Berlin, currently playing in the Rugby-Regionalliga, the German Women's Sevens Series and the Berlin-Brandenburg Sevens Series.

The club was formed in 2016, having both women's and men's teams since the beginning.

Since 2018 the Berlin Irish host an annual Beach Rugby tournament with a men's/mixed and women's competition at BeachMitte with teams visiting from all over Germany, Austria and the United Kingdom. After two events there was a two-year break due to the Covid-19 pandemic but the tournament resumed in 2022.

External links
 Official website

References 

German rugby union clubs
Rugby union in Berlin